Luren Dudley Dickinson (April 15, 1859 – April 22, 1943) was an American politician. He served as the 37th governor of Michigan from 1939 to 1941. He holds the record of the oldest person to ever serve as Michigan governor, beginning at the age of 79 and leaving office at the age of 81.

Early life
Dickinson was born in Niagara County, New York, son of Daniel Dickinson (1828-1903) and Hannah Elisabeth Dickinson (née Leavens; 1830–1916); as an infant his family moved to Michigan. In Michigan his family purchased land and undertook farming. As a boy Dickinson spent most of his time working on the family farm but by studying often at home he was able to complete high school and at the age of eighteen qualified to be a teacher. He was impressive as a teacher and thus moved up quickly becoming first principal and then superintendent of schools at the age of 21.  In 1888, he married Zora Della Cooley and they had one child by adoption - Rilla Ethel Patterson (née Dickinson), grandson Robert Patterson, and grand daughter Della Patterson, the latter would accompany the Governor while in office.

Politics
Dickinson's involvement in community schools sparked his interest in local politics. He joined the Republican Party, was elected to the Michigan State House of Representatives and served from 1897 to 1898 and from 1905 to 1908. He was then elected to the Michigan Senate and served from 1909 to 1910.

After his one term in the State Senate, Dickinson was elected the 35th lieutenant governor of Michigan in 1914 and later re-elected to this office. He would spend most of the rest of his political career as lieutenant governor, being elected to the post seven times and defeated three times (1924, 1932, and 1936). He was also an unsuccessful candidate in the Republican primary for governor in 1920 against Alex Groesbeck, who was successful in the general election. Dickinson served as Lieutenant Governor under five governors: Woodbridge N. Ferris, 1915–17; Albert Sleeper, 1917–21; Fred W. Green, 1927–29; Wilber Marion Brucker, 1929–33; and Frank Fitzgerald, 1939.

Gubernatorial succession
In 1939, incumbent Governor Frank Fitzgerald died suddenly in office and thus, a month short of Dickenson's 80th birthday, he became Governor of Michigan.

As governor he spent much of his time conducting state business at his farm near Charlotte, Michigan rather than at the state capital in Lansing. He was well known for his informal appearance and actions which included having his swearing in ceremony at his farm, dressing in modest clothing and continuing to undertake farm work during his term.  During his twenty one and a half months in office, a law was passed which made it mandatory for public school teachers to take an oath of loyalty to the government. Also during his term, gambling and open bars were contested and the Michigan National Guard was activated for service in World War II.

In 1940, he ran for a full term but his campaigning was hampered due to the illness and later death of his wife. He lost the election to Democrat Murray Van Wagoner.

Death
Dickinson was a member of the Grange and Knights of Pythias.  He died two years after leaving office at the age of eighty-four in Charlotte and is buried at the Maple Hill Cemetery of that town.

References

 National Governors Association
 The Political Graveyard
 Former Lt. Governors of Michigan
 Biography of Dickinson

1859 births
1943 deaths
People from Niagara County, New York
Republican Party governors of Michigan
Republican Party members of the Michigan House of Representatives
Republican Party Michigan state senators
Lieutenant Governors of Michigan
School superintendents in Michigan
Methodists from Michigan
Burials in Michigan
People from Charlotte, Michigan
Schoolteachers from Michigan
19th-century American politicians
20th-century American politicians